Malaika Underwood (born June 7, 1981) is a member of the United States women's national baseball team which won a gold medal at the 2015 Pan American Games.

Playing career
Raised in San Diego, Underwood played baseball, volleyball and basketball at La Jolla High School. She would earn the Female Athlete of the Year Award (1998–99) in San Diego County.

Baseball
As a child, she played baseball at Chollas Lake Little League.

Volleyball
She accepted a volleyball scholarship to the University of North Carolina. During her career, she would win the ACC Tournament MVP Award.

Personal
Underwood earned a bachelor's degree in international studies and a master's degree in sports administration from the University of North Carolina.

Awards and honors
 2008 Women's World Cup of Baseball All-Tournament Team (Second Base)
 2014 Women's World Cup of Baseball All-Tournament Team (First Base)

Bibliography

References

People from San Diego
American female baseball players
Baseball players from California
1981 births
Living people
Baseball players at the 2015 Pan American Games
Pan American Games gold medalists for the United States
Pan American Games medalists in baseball
Medalists at the 2015 Pan American Games
21st-century American women